Serpentine Dam may refer to:
 Serpentine Dam, Tasmania, the dam used to contain Lake Pedder in Tasmania, Australia
 Serpentine Dam, Western Australia, the water-supply dam for Perth, in Western Australia
 Serpentine Pipehead Dam, part of the water-supply dam in Western Australia